Ice VIII is a tetragonal crystalline form of ice formed from ice VII by cooling it below 5 °C. It is more ordered than ice VII, since the hydrogen atoms assume fixed positions.

Ordinary water ice is known as ice Ih, (in the Bridgman nomenclature). Different types of ice, from ice II to ice XVIII, have been created in the laboratory at different temperatures and pressures.

See also
Ice, for other crystalline forms of ice

References

Water ice